Camilla Spira (1 March 1906 – 25 August 1997) was a German film actress. She appeared in 68 films between 1924 and 1986. She was born in Hamburg, Germany, of Jewish ancestry on her father's side, and died in Berlin, Germany. Her father was the Austrian actor Fritz Spira who died in the Ruma concentration camp in 1943. Her mother was actress Lotte Spira and her sister was the East German actress Steffie Spira.

Selected filmography

 Mutter und Sohn (1924)
 In den Krallen der Schuld (1924) - Matia
 A Free People (1925)
 Im Krug zum grünen Kranze (1925) - Marie, seine Tochter
 The Heart on the Rhine (1925)
 The Pride of the Company (1926) - Minna
 We Belong to the Imperial-Royal Infantry Regiment (1926) - Köchin
 The Third Squadron (1926) - Ilonka, seine Tochter
 Maytime (1926) - Minchen Lemke, die Tochter
 Wrath of the Seas (1926)
 Aftermath (1927) - Marlene - Wirtschafterin
 On the Banks of the River Weser (1927)
 Love's Masquerade (1928) - Zofe
 Sixteen Daughters and No Father (1928)
 My Sister and I (1929) - Schuh-Molly
 Die Jugendgeliebte (1930)
 Die lustigen Musikanten (1930) - Anna Müller - Tochter
 Die Faschingsfee (1931) - Lori
 My Leopold (1931) - Klara, seine Tochter
 Der schönste Mann im Staate (1932) - Julischka
 Scandal on Park Street (1932)
 Ja, treu ist die Soldatenliebe (1932) - Lotte Kramereit
 The Eleven Schill Officers (1932) - Magd Anna
 The Heath Is Green (1932) - Grete Lüdersen
 Haunted People (1932)
 Morgenrot (1933) - GreteJaul, Fredericks' girl
 Jumping Into the Abyss (1933) - Anni
 The Testament of Dr. Mabuse (1933) - Juwelen-Anna
 The Roberts Case (1933) - Maria, seine Frau
 The Judas of Tyrol (1933) - Walpurga
 Her Highness Dances the Waltz (1935)
 Die Buntkarierten (1949) - Guste Schmiedecke
 Dr. Semmelweis (1950) - Josepha Hochleitner
 The Orplid Mystery (1950) - Pensionswirtin
 The Merry Wives of Windsor (1950) - Frau Gretchen Reich
 Three Days of Fear (1952) - Anna Espenlaub, seine Frau
 Pension Schöller (1952) - Ulrike
 The Merry Vineyard (1952) - Annemarie
 Emil and the Detectives (1954) - Emils Tante Martha Heimbold
 Roman eines Frauenarztes (1954) - Oberschwester Lindwedel
 The Devil's General (1955) - Kammersängerin Olivia Geiss
 Father's Day (1955) - Berta Helbig
 The Last Man (1955) - Sabine Hoevelmann
 Sky Without Stars (1955) - Elsbeth Friese
 Two Blue Eyes (1955) - Frau Friedrich
 Love (1956) - Frau Ballard
  (1956) - Frau Wermelskirch
 Made in Germany (1957) - Ottilie Zeiss
 The Mad Bomberg (1957) - Frau Kommerzienrat Mühlberg
 The Heart of St. Pauli (1957) - Trudchen Meyer
 Night Nurse Ingeborg (1958) - Frau Roeder
 The Csardas King (1958) - Frau Kalman
 Father, Mother and Nine Children (1958) - Martha Schiller
 Freddy, the Guitar and the Sea (1959) - Mutter Ossenkamp
 Roses for the Prosecutor (1959) - Hildegard Schramm
 Freddy unter fremden Sternen (1959)
 Vertauschtes Leben (1961) - Luise Lindner
 Das Mädchen und der Staatsanwalt (1962) - Gefängnisinsassin
 Piccadilly Zero Hour 12 (1963) - Pamela

References

External links

 Photographs and literature

1906 births
1997 deaths
German people of Jewish descent 
German film actresses
German television actresses
German silent film actresses
Actresses from Hamburg
20th-century German actresses